Benedictus Aretius (surname derived from Marti by Greek translation) (1505–1574) was a Swiss Protestant theologian, Protestant reformer and natural philosopher.

Life
He was born at Bätterkinden, in the canton of Bern, Switzerland. He studied at Strasbourg and at Marburg, where he became professor of logic. He was called to Bern as a school-teacher, 1548, and became professor of theology, 1564.

He died at Bern on 22 March 1574.

Works
His major work, Theologiæ problemata (Bern, 1573), was a compendium of the knowledge of the time and was highly valued. His Examen theologicum (1557) ran through six editions in fourteen years. His works also include

 a commentary on the New Testament (1580 and 1616) and on the Pentateuch (1602; 2d ed., with commentary on the Psalms added, 1618);
 a commentary on Pindar (1587);
 a description of the flora of two mountains of the Bernese Oberland, Stockhorn and Niesen (Strasbourg, 1561);
 a Hebrew method for schools (Basel, 1561); and 
 a defense of the execution (in 1566) of the antitrinitarian Valentin Gentilis (Geneva, 1567).

References
Schaff-Herzog article

External links

Attribution

1505 births
1574 deaths
People from Emmental District
Swiss Calvinist and Reformed theologians
16th-century Swiss scientists
16th-century Calvinist and Reformed theologians